Rossana is a 1953 Mexican drama film directed by Emilio Fernández. It was entered into the 1953 Cannes Film Festival.

Cast
 Rossana Podestà - Rossana
 Crox Alvarado - Antonio
 Armando Silvestre - José Luis
 Guillermo Cramer - Rivera
 Carlos Riquelme - Sponge Trader
 Margarito Luna - Fisherman
 Armando Velasco
 Lilia Fresno
 Antonio Bribiesca - Guitar player
 Emilio Garibay - Policeman
 Manuel Vergara 'Manver' - Bartender

References

External links

1953 films
1950s Spanish-language films
1953 drama films
Mexican black-and-white films
Films directed by Emilio Fernández
Mexican drama films
1950s Mexican films